Corcoran station is an Amtrak train station in Corcoran, California, United States.

History

Corcoran was made a scheduled stop on the Amtrak San Joaquin on July 29, 1989.

The current station building, opened in 1999, replaced a former Atchison, Topeka and Santa Fe Railway depot from 1907 that was demolished in 1998. It exhibits Spanish Revival style architecture that includes decorative curvilinear gables and stuccoed walls. The depot is decorated with a large bas-relief called “Life of the Valley" depicting the importance of water to the residents, agriculture, and wildlife of the San Joaquin Valley. Artist Garrett Masterson completed it with the help of his students at the nearby Corcoran State Prison.

References

External links

Corcoran, CA – USA Rail Guide (TrainWeb)

Amtrak stations in California
Corcoran, California
Railway stations in Kings County, California
Railway stations in the United States opened in 1999
1999 establishments in California
Railway stations in the United States opened in 1907